This is a list of National Liberal Party MPs.  It includes all Members of Parliament elected to the British House of Commons representing the National Liberal Party, originally known as the Liberal National Party.  In 1947, the party merged with the Conservative Party, so all its remaining MPs jointly represented both parties.

Graphical representation 

National Liberal Party (UK)
 List